Alfred James Vango (23 December 1900 – 24 November 1977) was an English professional footballer of the 1920s. Born in Walthamstow, he joined Gillingham from Walthamstow-based Gnome Athletic in 1923 and went on to make five appearances for the club in The Football League. He left to return to his native area and joined Walthamstow Avenue in 1929.

References

1900 births
1977 deaths
English footballers
People from Walthamstow
Gillingham F.C. players
Walthamstow Avenue F.C. players
Gnome Athletic F.C. players
Association football midfielders